Meridian Water railway station is on the Lea Valley Lines in Edmonton in the London Borough of Enfield, north London. It opened on 3 June 2019.

Layout

The new station has three platforms but passive provision for four has been made; the built platforms are numbered 2–4. Platform 1 remains unbuilt with no track laid, but space has been allowed for when required in the future. It is expected 4 million people will use the station annually. There are steps and lifts giving access to Meridian Way immediately to the east; there is also access to the west, which is to be the location of new housing in the Meridian Water development.

Services
All services at Meridian Water are operated by Greater Anglia.

Service history

Upon opening, the service pattern was peak hours only, similar to the service level of the former Angel Road station. The first service departed for London Liverpool Street on Monday, 3 June 2019 at 05:57.

Current services

As of 9 September 2019, the station is served by a half-hourly shuttle service to Stratford, calling at Northumberland Park, Tottenham Hale and Lea Bridge which terminates at Meridian Water. Additional trains to and from Hertford East and Bishops Stortford call at Meridian Water during peak periods.

Connections
London bus routes 192 and 341 serve the nearby Tesco superstore just off Meridian Way.

References

External links

Railway stations in the London Borough of Enfield
Railway stations opened by Network Rail
Railway stations in Great Britain opened in 2019
Greater Anglia franchise railway stations